James C. Summer O'Neal (February 13, 1924 – October 13, 1959) was an American football guard.

O'Neal was born in Anna, Texas, and attended Anna High School. He played college football for TCU, Texas Mines, and Southwestern (TX). 

He played professional football in the All-America Football Conference for the Chicago Rockets from 1946 to 1947. He appeared in 24 games, seven as a starter.

O'Neal died in 1959 in Waller County, Texas.

References

1924 births
1959 deaths
American football guards
Chicago Rockets players
TCU Horned Frogs football players
UTEP Miners football players
Southwestern Pirates football players
Players of American football from Texas